The Hen and Chicken Islands (usually known collectively as the Hen and Chickens) lie to the east of the North Auckland Peninsula off the coast of northern New Zealand.

History 

Approximately 18,000 years ago during the Last Glacial Maximum when sea levels were over 100 metres lower than present day levels, the islands were hilly features surrounded by a vast coastal plain. Sea levels began to rise 7,000 years ago, after which the islands separated from the rest of New Zealand.

These islands were given their European name by Captain James Cook, who first sighted them on 25 November 1769. It has been suggested that the name was inspired by an old name for the star cluster usually known as the Pleiades.

Originally owned by the Māori Ngā Puhi iwi, they were sold to the New Zealand Government in 1883. The islands were made a scenic reserve in 1908 owing to the rarity of their flora and fauna, and became a wildlife refuge in 1953. Hen Island had actually passed from Māori hands a few years earlier, being bought by Thomas Outhwaite in 1872. It was bequeathed to the nation by his daughter Isa Outhwaite in 1927, and it too was named as a scenic reserve.

In June 1940, the Canadian-Australasian Royal Mail Ship  sank off the islands after hitting a mine. Most of the cargo, which included gold bullion, was later salvaged.

Environment 
The islands are noted for their bird life with colonies of seabirds as well as forest birds which have become scarce or extinct on the mainland.  The islands have been identified as an Important Bird Area, by BirdLife International because they are home to a breeding population of about 500 pairs of Pycroft's petrels. There are also native reptiles on the islands, including tuatara, geckos and skinks.

The islands 

Taranga (Hen) Island 
 is the largest island by some considerable margin, totalling . Sail Rock, a stack, rises from the ocean  to the south of Hen Island, and is a prominent navigational point for yachts.

By the late 1800s, Hen Island was the only place in New Zealand with a surviving population of North Island saddleback. The once common species of forest bird found in the North Island, was nearly wiped out by the human introduction of mammalian predators, such as rats and stoats. In the 1960s translocations of saddleback from Hen Island to other island sanctuaries around New Zealand began.

Wareware and Muriwhenua 

Mauitaha 

The New Zealand Department of Conservation and the Ngati Wai iwi have entered into partnership to set up a sanctuary for the Polynesian rat, or kiore, on the islands Mauitaha and Araara. A spokesman for Ngati Wai said the kiore heritage will be protected as the movement of the kiore through the Pacific paralleled the migration of the New Zealand Maori. A spokesman for the Department of Conservation said the Department's policy change from eradication would assist scientific research.

Lady Alice Island 
Named after Lady Alice Fergusson (wife of Governor General Sir Charles Fergusson), it is the largest of the five Chickens and is of particular significance because of its flora and fauna. It was occupied by Māori until the 1820s, and was used as a base for fishermen in the 1890s. Cattle were introduced at about this time, but were removed in the 1920s.

Whatupuke 
Formerly known as Whakahau this island is composed of a large eastern section and a peninsula to the southwest.

Coppermine Island 
It is composed of two sections joined by a short isthmus. As the name suggests, there are copper deposits on the island, but attempts at mining them in 1849 and 1898 proved unprofitable.

Gallery

See also 
 List of islands of New Zealand
 New Zealand outlying islands

References

External links 
 Hen and Chickens chain

Whangarei District
Important Bird Areas of New Zealand
Protected areas of the Northland Region
Islands of the Northland Region